George Shea Flinn III (born January 30, 1973) is an American attorney and Democratic Party politician who served as a member of the Tennessee Senate. When Steve Cohen resigned from the chamber shortly after his election to the United States House of Representatives, the Shelby County Commission appointed Flinn to fill the seat until a special election could be held. From 2007 to 2015, Flinn served on the Memphis City Council.

Flinn's father, George Flinn, is a Memphis physician who has run for Congress multiple times as a Republican.

References

Democratic Party Tennessee state senators
Living people
1973 births
21st-century American politicians